Mukhbain Singh (born 12 December 1944) is an Indian field hockey player. He won the bronze medal at the 1972 Summer Olympics in Munich.

Early life and education
Singh was born in village Shatab Garh, Punjab Province, British India (now in Pakistan). The son of S. Darbara Singh and Surinder Kaur, who migrated to Gurdaspur after the partition of India in 1947. He has a brother (also a former international hockey player) and two sisters. He passed matriculation from Guru Nanak Khalsa High School, Batala (Punjab, India).

Career
Singh started playing hockey from an early age. While playing for his school, he was selected in the district team and from there was selected in the Punjab team. After that he joined Indian Railways in 1965 as a sub-inspector (RPF) against sports quota.

International career
While playing in the Nehru Cup for Railways in 1965, he was selected in the Indian team for test matches against Japan. He officially joined Railways in 1966 and after that he played many international tournaments including the Munich Olympics, where he was the vice-captain of the Indian team. He also played in the 1970 Asian Games.

International events
 Played test matches against Japan, 1965
 Played international hockey tournament held at Hamburg (West Germany), 1966
 Standby in Asian Games, 1966
 Played pre-Olympic hockey tournament at London, 1967
 Played international hockey tournament at Madrid (Spain), 1967
 Played test matches against Holland and East Germany, 1967
 Toured Ceylon (Sri Lanka), 1967
 Played test matches against Kenya, 1969
 Played Asian Games held at Bangkok, 1970(silver medal)
 Played Olympic Games held at Munich (West Germany), 1972.
 Vice Captain of the Indian hockey team.
 Top scorer from the Indian side and the third highest scorer in the Olympic Games with 9 goals, including his hat-trick against Australia and three goals against England and also scored the winning goal against Holland in the bronze medal match.

Achievements
 Won best Sports person of the year award from Railways in 1973.
 Won Dhyan Chand award for his lifetime achievements by the President of India in 2008.

References

External links
 
 Sikh Hockey Olympians
 Sports Reference
 Indian Olympic Association

Field hockey players from Punjab, India
Living people
Olympic medalists in field hockey
1944 births
Asian Games medalists in field hockey
Field hockey players at the 1970 Asian Games
Indian male field hockey players
Field hockey players at the 1972 Summer Olympics
Olympic field hockey players of India
Asian Games silver medalists for India
Medalists at the 1970 Asian Games
Medalists at the 1972 Summer Olympics
Olympic bronze medalists for India
Recipients of the Dhyan Chand Award